Dowsing Anemone with Copper Tongue is the second studio album by American avant-garde metal band Kayo Dot, released on Robotic Empire in 2006. The album received high praise from Pitchfork, Lambgoat, and Sputnikmusic, the last of whom named it the #2 album of 2006.

Shortly before the recording of the album, longtime collaborator and former maudlin of the Well member Sam Gutterman left to pursue outside projects, and was replaced by Tom Malone. It was the group's first and only release on the Robotic Empire label. The group embarked on a lengthy and highly successful tour after the album's release, which would be the last tour in which the band was mostly made up of former motW members, as Greg Massi left shortly after the tour to pursue solo projects, eventually forming the band Baliset. Ryan McGuire and Forbes Graham also left after the tour.

Track listing
All music written by Toby Driver. All lyrics written by Jason Byron except "Immortelle and Paper Caravelle" by Toby Driver.

Credits
Toby Driver - guitar, piano, clarinet, percussion, and voice
Greg Massi - guitar, vocals, percussion
Mia Matsumiya - violin and percussion
Forbes Graham - trumpet, euphonium, percussion, and voice
Ryan McGuire - bass and voice
John Carchia - guitar and voice
Tom Malone - drums and other percussion
Kyouhei Sada - guitar, keyboards, effects, and voice

References

2006 albums
Kayo Dot albums
Robotic Empire albums